Euchaetes zella is a moth of the family Erebidae. It was described by Harrison Gray Dyar Jr. in 1903. It is found in the US states of Arizona, California, Nevada, New Mexico, Oklahoma and Texas.

The wingspan is about 26 mm.

References

 Arctiidae genus list at Butterflies and Moths of the World of the Natural History Museum

Phaegopterina
Moths described in 1903